György Sándor (born 20 March 1984) is a Hungarian footballer who plays for Csákvári TK as a midfielder. He was born in Carpathian Ruthenia to an ethnic Hungarian family.

Career
Sándor started his professional career in Újpest FC. In season 2004-05 he played in Győri ETO FC. In June 2005 György returned to Újpest FC. For three seasons he earned 71 appearances, scored nine goals.

On 15 November 2006 Sándor made his debut for Hungary national football team in a friendly match against Canada. In February 2007 he played for the team in matches against Cyprus and Latvia.

Amidst rumours circulating over Sándor's fitness after a recent ankle injury, the midfielder completed a loan deal taking him to Plymouth Argyle until the end of the season, with a view to make the move permanent, on 24 January 2008 . On 23 April, Sándor returned from the loan to Újpest FC.

In January 2009, Sándor was loaned by Bulgarian Litex Lovech. Sándor was given the number 24 shirt. He made his team debut a few days later in Dubai, in an 0-0 friendly draw against FC Bunyodkor. Sándor scored his first goal in the league against PFC Lokomotiv Mezdra. In January 2013 he joined Ittihad FC .

On 16 July 2015 Sándor signed a two-year deal with Perth Glory. At the end of the season, on 8 May 2016, he was released by the club and returned to Hungary due to family reasons.

Honours
Litex Lovech
 Bulgarian Cup: 2009

Videoton
 Nemzeti Bajnokság I: 2010–11

Ittihad FC
 King Cup of Champions: 2012–13

Karpatalja
ConIFA World Football Cup: 2018

Club statistics

References

External links
 György Sándor profile at magyarfutball.hu
 György Sándor at HLSZ
 
 

1984 births
Living people
Hungarian footballers
Hungary international footballers
Association football midfielders
Újpest FC players
Győri ETO FC players
Plymouth Argyle F.C. players
PFC Litex Lovech players
Perth Glory FC players
Fehérvár FC players
Ittihad FC players
Csákvári TK players
Nemzeti Bajnokság I players
First Professional Football League (Bulgaria) players
Saudi Professional League players
A-League Men players
Hungarian expatriate footballers
Expatriate footballers in England
Expatriate footballers in Bulgaria
Expatriate footballers in Saudi Arabia
Expatriate soccer players in Australia
Hungarian expatriate sportspeople in England
Hungarian expatriate sportspeople in Bulgaria
Hungarian expatriate sportspeople in Saudi Arabia
Hungarian expatriate sportspeople in Australia
Sportspeople from Uzhhorod
Ukrainian people of Hungarian descent